The Recreational Aviation Foundation (RAF) is an IRS 501(c)(3) Charitable organization that focuses on preserving, improving, and creating backcountry airstrips for general aviation use.  The RAF works with many national and state government organizations to identify new areas for airstrips and then assists with their funding. The RAF also educates members of government and the general public about the importance of backcountry airstrips and the need to keep them for future generations. The Recreational Aviation Foundation maintains liaisons and ambassadors in most U.S. states to help lead projects at the local level.

Achievements 
 The RAF was instrumental in the passing of H.Rer. 1473 in 2010 that "placed value of recreational aviation and backcountry airstrips" for the public to use and on public land.
 The RAF worked with the Bureau of Land Management along with countless volunteer hours to help preserve Upper Missouri River Breaks National Monument Airstrips.
 In conjunction with the United States Forest Service the RAF worked from 2003 to 2010 to open a new airstrip, Russian Flat Airstrip , earning the Flying (magazine) Editors' Choice Awards for industry innovation in 2011.
 RAF volunteers continue to maintain Chicken Strip in Death Valley National Park, repairing the airstrip in both 2011 and 2016.
 In 2020, RAF funding assisted in the acquisition of Goodspeed Airport in eastern Connecticut by a consortium of area pilots, intending to revitalize the airport and bring a greater aviation community to the airport and seaplane base.

See also 

 Aircraft Owners and Pilots Association
 Experimental Aircraft Association

References 

Aviation organizations based in the United States
Political advocacy groups in the United States